Czerniak may refer to:
Czerniak (surname)
Czerniak, Warmian-Masurian Voivodeship
Czerniak, Kuyavian-Pomeranian Voivodeship
Czerniak., botanical author abbreviation for Ekaterina Georgiewna Czerniakowska (1892-1942)

It is also the Polish word for "melanoma".